Yukiko Mishima is a Japanese film director born  in Kita-ku, Osaka.

Her first feature film, Shisei: Nihohi tsuki no gotoku, based on the Jun'ichirō Tanizaki story "The Tatooer", was released in 2009. 
She received best director from the Hochi Film Award in 2017 for Dear Etranger, and Special Grand Prix of the Jury award at the Montreal World Film Festival.
Shape of Red, an adaptation of Rio Shimamoto's 2014 novel Reddo, was released in 2020.

She is a graduate of Kobe College.

Filmography
As director
Shisei: Nihohi tsuki no gotoku (2009)
しあわせのパン Shiawase no pan / Bread of Happiness (2012)
ぶどうのなみだ Budô no namida / A Drop of the Grapevine (2014)
繕い裁つ人 Tsukuroi Tatsu Hito / A Stitch of Life (2015)
少女 Shôjo / Night's Tightrope (2016)
幼な子われらに生まれ Osanago warera ni umare / Dear Etranger (2017)
Biblia Koshodô no Jiken Techô / The Antique: Secret of the Old Books (2018)
映画 Shape of Red (2020)
Screenwriter
破れたハートを売り物に Kowareta Heart wo Urimono ni / Broken Hearts for Sale (2015)

References

Further reading

External links
  (in Japanese)

1969 births
Living people
Japanese film directors
People from Osaka
Japanese women film directors
Japanese screenwriters
Japanese women screenwriters